Lake Chabot Regional Park is a regional park located in the southern Berkeley Hills in Alameda County, California. It is part of the East Bay Regional Parks system.

Lake Chabot is a reservoir located in the park.  The northern part of the lake and park lie within the boundary of the City of Oakland, while the southern part lies in an unincorporated area of Alameda County adjacent to Castro Valley and San Leandro.

The dam and reservoir's water are part of the East Bay Municipal Utility District (EBMUD) water system.

Gallery

See also
 Lake Chabot

References

External links 
Official Lake Chabot Regional Park website
EBMUD official website

East Bay Regional Park District
Berkeley Hills
Parks in Alameda County, California
Parks in Oakland, California
Geography of San Leandro, California
Parks in the San Francisco Bay Area